David Soriano (born 26 June 1944) is a Dominican Republic sprinter. He competed in the men's 4 × 400 metres relay at the 1968 Summer Olympics.

References

1944 births
Living people
Athletes (track and field) at the 1968 Summer Olympics
Dominican Republic male sprinters
Olympic athletes of the Dominican Republic
Place of birth missing (living people)